St. John the Baptist Parish School Board is a school district headquartered in unincorporated St. John the Baptist Parish, Louisiana, United States.

It serves St. John the Baptist Parish.

School uniforms
All schools in the district require school uniforms.

Schools
All schools are located in unincorporated areas.

High schools
East St. John High School (Reserve)
West St. John High School

K-8 schools
Zoned
East St. John Elementary School
Fifth Ward Elementary School
Garyville-Mt. Airy Math and Science Magnet School (Zoned and magnet)
Lake Pontchartrain Elementary School
LaPlace Elementary School
Emily C. Watkins Elementary School (opening at a future date - groundbreaking in 2007)
West St. John Elementary School
Magnet
John L. Ory Communication Arts Magnet School

Alternative schools
Leon Godchaux Accelerated Program

References

External links

 St. John The Baptist Parish School Board

School districts in Louisiana
Education in St. John the Baptist Parish, Louisiana